Marino Marić (born 1 June 1990) is a Croatian professional handball player for TVB Stuttgart and the Croatian national team.

He participated at the 2016, 2018 and at the 2020 European Championships.

Honours
Zagreb
Dukat Premier League: 2009–10, 2010–11, 2011–12, 2012–13, 2013–14
Croatian Cup: 2010, 2011, 2012, 2013, 2014
SEHA League: 2012–13

References

External links

1990 births
Living people
Sportspeople from Mostar
Croatian male handball players
Expatriate handball players
Croatian expatriate sportspeople in Germany
Handball-Bundesliga players
MT Melsungen players
RK Zagreb players
Competitors at the 2013 Mediterranean Games
Mediterranean Games silver medalists for Croatia
Mediterranean Games medalists in handball